Maile Mölder (born 23 July 1977) is an Estonian curler and curling coach.

At the national level, she is a nine-time Estonian women's champion curler (2005, 2006, 2008, 2010, 2012, 2013, 2014, 2015, 2016), a five-time Estonian mixed champion curler (2009, 2011, 2012, 2013, 2014) and a three-time Estonian mixed doubles champion curler (2013, 2015, 2017).

Teams

Women's

Mixed

Mixed doubles

Record as a coach of national teams

References

External links

Maile Mölder - ERR Sport
Maile Mölder - Teemalehed - DELFI
Video: 

Living people
1979 births
Sportspeople from Tallinn
Estonian female curlers
Estonian curling champions
Estonian curling coaches